Cyardium castelnaudii is a species of beetle in the family Cerambycidae. It was described by James Thomson in 1864. It is known from Malaysia, Java, and Sumatra.

References

Pteropliini
Beetles described in 1864